Benjamin Huger (1768July 7, 1823) was a United States representative from South Carolina. Born at or near Charleston in the Province of South Carolina in 1768, he pursued an academic course and engaged in the cultivation of rice on the Waccamaw River. He was a member of the South Carolina House of Representatives from 1796 to 1798, and was elected as a Federalist to the Sixth, Seventh, and Eighth U.S. Congresses, serving from March 4, 1799 to March 3, 1805. He was again a member of the State house of representatives from 1806 to 1813, and was then elected to the Fourteenth U.S. Congress, serving from March 4, 1815 to March 3, 1817. He was a member of the South Carolina Senate from 1818 to 1823 and served as its president from 1819 to 1822. He died on his estate on Waccamaw River, near Georgetown, South Carolina; interment was in All Saints' Churchyard.

References

1768 births
1823 deaths
Politicians from Charleston, South Carolina
Members of the South Carolina House of Representatives
South Carolina state senators
Federalist Party members of the United States House of Representatives from South Carolina